The Dorothea Dix Hospital was the first North Carolina psychiatric hospital located on Dix Hill in Raleigh, North Carolina and named after mental health advocate Dorothea Dix from New England.  It was founded in 1856 and closed in 2012. The site is now known as Dorothea Dix Park and serves as Raleigh's largest city park.

History 

In 1848, Dorothea Dix visited North Carolina and called for reform in the care of mentally ill patients. In 1849, when the North Carolina State Medical Society was formed, the construction of an institution in the capital, Raleigh, for the care of mentally ill patients was authorized. The hospital opened in 1856 as Dix Hill in honor of her grandfather and was almost 100 years later named in honor of Dorothea Lynde Dix.

The hospital grounds at one time included , which were used for the hospital's farms, orchards, livestock, maintenance buildings, employee housing, and park grounds. In 1984, the Hunt administration transferred 385 acres to North Carolina State University's "Centennial Campus," and in 1985, the Martin administration transferred an additional 450 acres. Other pieces of the property now include the State Farmer's Market.

As of 2000, a consultant said the hospital needed to close. This move was made despite the fact that the hospital was operating well and that its closure meant that mental health patients would have no local, public facility to use for care. The hospital land was purchased by the state to house the hospital.

The Dorothea Dix Hospital was at one time slated to be closed by the state by 2008, and the fate of the remaining  was a matter of much discussion and debate in state and local circles. As of October 6, 2008, according to the News & Observer, state officials were calling the facility "Central Regional Hospital - Raleigh Campus." But in 2009, the state announced that Dorothea Dix Hospital would not be closing and would not be a "satellite" of CRH. It was announced in August 2010 that a lack of funding meant the facility would "shut its doors by the end of the year."

A thorough history of the hospital was published in 2010 by the Office of Archives and History of the North Carolina Department of Cultural Resources.
  
In August 2012, Dorothea Dix Hospital moved its last patients to Central Regional Hospital in Butner, North Carolina, which critics said did not provide enough beds for even the most serious cases. To help alleviate the situation, in May 2012, UNC agreed to spend $40 million on mental health services.

The hospital is the setting for "Dix Hill," David Sedaris' reminiscence of working there as a volunteer in his youth, published in his collection, Naked.

On May 5, 2015, the Council of State members voted unanimously to approve selling the 308 acres to the city. Proceeds of the sale will go to "fund facilities and services for the mentally ill."  Located on the property is Spring Hill, listed on the National Register of Historic Places in 1983. The property is now operated as a city park and is open to the public. 

The former hospital is now home to the North Carolina Department of Health and Human Services, Ryan McBryde Building.

References

External links 
 North Carolina Department of Health & Human Services
 Dorothea Dix Park

Hospital buildings completed in 1856
Psychiatric hospitals in North Carolina
Hospitals in Raleigh, North Carolina
1856 establishments in North Carolina